Elections were held in the organized municipalities in the Rainy River District of Ontario on October 22, 2018 in conjunction with municipal elections across the province.

Alberton

Source:

Atikokan

Chapple

Source:

Dawson

Emo

Source:

Fort Frances

Source:

Lake of the Woods

La Vallee

Source:

Morley

Rainy River

References 

Rainy River
Rainy River District